Sebastiania potamophila is a species of flowering plant in the family Euphorbiaceae. It was originally described as Excoecaria potamophila Müll.Arg. in 1874. It is native to Bahia, Brazil.

References

Plants described in 1874
Flora of Brazil
potamophila